Bhagat Ki Kothi–Mannargudi Superfast Weekly Express is an Express train of the Indian Railways connecting  in Rajasthan and   in Tamil Nadu. It has been upgraded as a Superfast Express and is currently being operated with 22673/22674 train numbers after vivir lockdown on once a week basis.

Service

The 16863/Bhagat Ki Kothi–Mannargudi Weekly Expresses has an average speed of 57 km/hr and covers 2859 km in 48.30 hrs. 16864/Mannargudi–Bhagat ki Kothi Weekly Express has an average speed of 53 km/hr and covers  2859 km in 50 hrs 05 mins. This train is being operated by Southern railway zone and maintained at Tiruchirappalli Junction. Empty rakes are transported to Tiruchirappalli after reaching Mannargudi. During its maintenance journey, it has a rake reversal at Nidamangalam Junction.

Schedule

Runs One day for each Side

Route and halts 

The important halts of the train are :

 
 
 
 
  (reversal done) 
 
  (reversal done)

Traction

As the route is yet to be fully electrified, it is hauled by a Bhagat Ki Kothi Diesel Loco Shed-based WDP-4 locomotive from Bhagat Ki Kothi up to Sawai Madhopur, handing over to an Itarsi Electric Loco Shed-based WAP-4 locomotive for the remainder of the journey until Mannargudi.

Coach composition

The train consists of 18 coaches:

 2 AC II Tier
 4 AC III Tier
 6 Sleeper coaches
 6 General
 2 Second-class Luggage/parcel van

Direction reversal

The train reverses its direction twice:

 
 
  (during maintenance run alone)

See also 

 Bikaner–Coimbatore Superfast AC Express

References

External links 
 16863/Bhagat Ki Kothi - Mannargudi Weekly Express India Rail Info
 16864/Mannargudi - Bhagat ki Kothi Weekly Express India Rail Info

Transport in Mannargudi
Transport in Jodhpur
Rail transport in Rajasthan
Rail transport in Madhya Pradesh
Rail transport in Maharashtra
Rail transport in Telangana
Rail transport in Andhra Pradesh
Rail transport in Tamil Nadu
Express trains in India
Railway services introduced in 2015